Endless Night is a 2015 drama film directed by Isabel Coixet. It was selected to open the 65th Berlin International Film Festival. The film is set in 1908 in Greenland and is an international co-production between Spain, France and Bulgaria. The film premiered with the title Nobody Wants the Night. Following poor reviews and sales the film was recut by Coixet and released under the title Endless Night.

Plot
Greenland, 1908. Josephine, the confident and bold wife of the famous Arctic explorer, Robert Peary, embarks on a dangerous journey in pursuit of her husband who is seeking a route to the North Pole. She meets Allaka, an Eskimo girl who is pregnant.

Cast
 Rinko Kikuchi as Allaka
 Juliette Binoche as Josephine Peary
 Gabriel Byrne as Bram Trevor
 Matt Salinger as Captain Spalding
 Velizar Binev as Fyodor
 Ciro Miró as Cyrus

Reception
The film received negative reviews after its Berlin premiere. Peter Bradshaw from The Guardian gave the film two stars out of five and observed that "[t]he film is possessed of blandly humanistic flavours, new-agey gestures and quaint stereotypes". The Hollywood Reporter called it "inconsistent" and "a mixed bag". In his review for Variety, Guy Lodge wrote that "[the film] is dramatically as pallid and lifeless as the frozen tundra on which it takes place". Indiewire's Jessica Kiang criticized the script and Coixet's direction, adding that "whenever it threatens to find its way, it soon loses it again".

The film received a warmer reception in Coixet's native Spain after its November release, getting three and four-star reviews from outlets such as El Mundo, Cinemanía and La Vanguardia.

Awards and nominations

See also
 Survival film, about the film genre, with a list of related films

References

External links
 
 

2015 films
2015 drama films
Spanish drama films
French drama films
Bulgarian drama films
English-language Bulgarian films
English-language French films
English-language Spanish films
Films directed by Isabel Coixet
Films set in 1908
Films set in Greenland
Films scored by Lucas Vidal
2010s English-language films
2010s Spanish films
2010s French films